Gearóid M. Hegarty (born 10 August 1994) is an Irish hurler and Gaelic footballer who plays as a right wing-forward for club side St Patrick's and at inter-county level with the Limerick senior hurling team. He is a former member of the Limerick senior football team.

Early life

Hegarty was born in Limerick. His father, Ger Hegarty, was an All-Ireland runner-up with the Limerick senior hurling team in 1994.

Playing career

College

Hegarty first came to prominence as a hurler with Castletroy College. On 19 October 2011, he was a forward on the first Castletroy College team to play in the Harty Cup.

University

During his studies at the University of Limerick, Hegarty was selected for the college's senior hurling team. On 24 February 2018, he won a Fitzgibbon Cup medal following UL's 2-21 to 2-15 defeat of Dublin City University in the final. Hegarty was also a regular for the University of Limerick football team in the Sigerson Cup.

Club

Hegarty joined the St. Patrick's club at a young age and played in all grades as a dual player at juvenile and underage levels. On 12 October 2014, Hegarty was at full forward when St. Patrick's were defeated by Ballylanders in the final of the Limerick Football Championship.

Inter-county

Under-21

Hegarty first played for Limerick as a Gaelic footballer with the under-21 team. He made his first appearance in a 3-15 to 0-08 Munster Championship defeat by Cork on 19 March 2014.

Hegarty became a dual under-21 player in 2015 and won a Munster Championship medal after a 0-22 to 0-19 win over Clare in the final. On 12 September 2015, Hegarty was at midfield when Limerick defeated Wexford by 0-26 to 1-07 in the All-Ireland final.

Senior

Hegarty first played at senior level as a member of the Limerick senior football team. He made his first appearance in a 2-11 to 0-11 defeat of Longford in the National Football League on 9 February 2014. Hegarty later made his first championship start on a 2-14 to 1-11 defeat by Tipperary in the Munster Championship.

Hegarty played in the early rounds of the National Football League in 2016 before joining the Limerick senior hurling team. He made his first appearance for the hurlers on 13 March 2016, replacing Seánie O'Brien at half-time in a 6-29 to 1-12 defeat of Laois at the Gaelic Grounds. Hegarty  later made his first championship appearance in a 3-12 to 1-16 defeat by Tipperary.

In 2017 Hegarty left the Limerick senior football team and committed solely to the hurlers after an end to the facilitating of dual players.

On 19 August 2018, Hegarty was at right wing-forward when Limerick won their first All-Ireland title in 45 years after a 3-16 to 2-18 defeat of Galway in the final. He ended the season by being nominated for an All-Star Award.

On 31 March 2019, Hegarty was selected at right wing-forward for Limerick's National League final meeting with Waterford at Croke Park. He collected a winners' medal after scoring three points from play in the 1-24 to 0-19 victory. On 30 June 2019, Hegarty won a Munster Championship medal after scoring three points from right wing-forward in Limerick's 2-26 to 2-14 defeat of Tipperary in the final.

Career statistics

Personal life
Hegarty also plays association football at Junior D level for Aisling Annacotty AFC.

Honours

University of Limerick
 Fitzgibbon Cup: 2018

Limerick
All-Ireland Senior Hurling Championship: 2018, 2020, 2021, 2022
Munster Senior Hurling Championship: 2019, 2020, 2021, 2022
National Hurling League: 2019, 2020
 All-Ireland Under-21 Hurling Championship: 2015
 Munster Under-21 Hurling Championship: 2015

Individual
All Stars Hurler of the Year (1): 2020
All-Star Award (3): 2020, 2021, 2022
The Sunday Game Team of the Year: 2020, 2022
The Sunday Game Hurler of the Year: 2020
All-Ireland Senior Hurling Championship Final Man of the Match (2): 2020, 2022
GAA/GPA Player of the Month: October 2020, December 2020

References

1994 births
Living people
All Stars Awards winners (hurling)
Dual players
Hurling forwards
Irish schoolteachers
Limerick inter-county hurlers
Limerick inter-county Gaelic footballers
St Patrick's (Limerick) hurlers
St Patrick's (Limerick) Gaelic footballers